Doug Redl (born September 3, 1956) is a former Canadian football offensive lineman who played four seasons in the Canadian Football League (CFL) with the Toronto Argonauts and Hamilton Tiger-Cats. He was drafted by the Saskatchewan Roughriders as a territorial exemption in the 1978 CFL Draft. He played CIS football at the University of Saskatchewan and attended Evan Hardy Collegiate in Saskatoon, Saskatchewan. He is the older brother of fellow CFL player Scott Redl.

College career
Redl played for the Saskatchewan Huskies from 1974 to 1977. He named to the Canada West conference all-star team at offensive guard in 1976 and 1977. He also earned CIAU All-Canadian honours both years. Redl was named to the Canadian team for the Can-Am Bowl in Tampa, Florida, featuring college all-stars from Canada and the U.S, in 1977.

Professional career
Redl was selected by the Saskatchewan Roughriders as a territorial exemption in the 1978 CFL Draft. He played for the Toronto Argonauts from 1978 to 1979. He played for the Hamilton Tiger-Cats in 1980 and 1982. His career ended due to a leg injury.

Coaching career
Redl was an assistant coach for the Saskatchewan Huskies in 1984.

References

External links
Just Sports Stats

Living people
1956 births
Players of Canadian football from Saskatchewan
Canadian football offensive linemen
Saskatchewan Huskies football players
Toronto Argonauts players
Hamilton Tiger-Cats players
Sportspeople from Saskatoon